Ralph Dixon McAlister (October 13, 1928 – August 13, 2003) was an American gridiron football player and coach. He played college football at the University of Minnesota and professionally in Canadian football for the Winnipeg Blue Bombers. McAlister was drafted by the Detroit Lions in the 1950 NFL Draft. He served as the head football coach at Macalester College in Saint Paul, Minnesota from 1959 to 1963 and North Central College in Naperville, Illinois from 1964 to 1969.

McAlister also coached track and swimming at Macalester. He resigned in 1964 to become head football coach at athletic director at North Central.

Head coaching record

References

1928 births
2003 deaths
American football halfbacks
American players of Canadian football
Macalester Scots football coaches
Minnesota Golden Gophers football players
North Central Cardinals athletic directors
North Central Cardinals football coaches
Winnipeg Blue Bombers players
College swimming coaches in the United States
College track and field coaches in the United States
Players of American football from Wichita, Kansas